Martin Hangl (born June 17, 1962) is a retired Swiss alpine skier. He won the gold medal in the Super-G at the WC 1989 in Vail. In addition he won three other world cup competitions. He also competed in three events at the 1988 Winter Olympics. Hangl withdrew from the 1988 Olympics men's  giant slalom after he witnessed 47 year old Austrian Olympic Team physician Joerg Oberhammer's death from the chairlift. Oberhammer died after falling into the path of a snow-grooming machine after colliding with another skier between runs of the men's giant slalom.

World Cup victories

References

External links
 http://www.ski-db.com/db/profiles/martin_hangl_sui_hngma.asp

1962 births
Living people
Swiss male alpine skiers
Place of birth missing (living people)
Olympic alpine skiers of Switzerland
Alpine skiers at the 1988 Winter Olympics
20th-century Swiss people